Aminath Noora (born 11 February 1986) is a Maldivian actress.

Career
In 2004, Noora made her screen debut with a video single directed by Mohamed Niyaz and rendered by Fazeela Amir. Titled "Jaadhooga Jeheyney", the song topped several charts and was a hit, resulting in another video collaboration with Niyaz. Titled "Visnaa Visnaa", the song marks the first Maldivian single aired through MTV (India).

Noora made her film debut with a Dark Rain Entertainment production, the Ali Shifau-directed romantic comedy Vaashey Mashaa Ekee (2016) opposite Mohamed Jumayyil and Mariyam Majudha narrating the life of a happily married couple being separated due to the husband's crippling fear of commitment on his wife's pregnancy. Her performance as a responsible mother and a caring friend fetched her a nomination as the Best Female Debut at the 8th Gaumee Film Awards ceremony.

In 2017, Noora featured in the Ali Shifau-directed romantic comedy Mee Loaybakee alongside Mohamed Jumayyil and Mariyam Azza. The film, which is considered to include the largest cast in a Maldivian feature film, narrates the story of two ex-lovers sliding into the friend zone with the envy and diffidence they experience amidst a convoluted love-triangle. The film and her performance received mainly positive reviews from critics where Aishath Maaha of Avas called her acting to be "good overall". The film emerged as one of the highest grossing Maldivian films of 2017.

Filmography

Feature film

Television

Short film

Accolades

References 

Living people
People from Malé
21st-century Maldivian actresses
Maldivian film actresses
1986 births